Baudonivia (fl. c. 600) was a nun and hagiographer at the convent of Holy Cross of Poitiers. Very little is known about her.

Article body 
She is the author of the "second part" (in truth a new version) of the Vita Radegundis, a biography of Frankish queen and founder of the Holy Cross abbey, Radegund, which she wrote at Chelles Abbey sometime between 599 and 614. With the former half having been written by Venantius Fortunatus, she regarded her work like the latter half of a diptych. Baudonivia exhibited humility when writing her part of the Vita Radegundis claiming to be unworthy. Baudonivia reveals how she looks up to Radegund and Venantius Fortunatus. Baudonivia spend her life at the convent of Holy Cross of Poitiers which was founded by Radegund leading to Baudonivia's admiration for Radegund.

Illuminated Manuscript of St. Radegund inspired, in part, by the work of Baudonivia

Based on her personal knowledge of Radegund, Venantius Fortunatus' biography, and hagiographical sources, Baudonivia created a portrait of a devout yet politically shrewd woman who used her worldly power to sustain the monastery. Her work has been characterized as faithful to the picture painted by Venantius Fortunatus, but more significantly influenced by the ideology of Caesarius of Arles's Regula Virginum with the clear purpose of providing a model of sanctity for the nuns of her generation. The focus on Radegund as a model for nuns shows how Baudonivia herself sought to model her own life after Radegund as a nun of her convent. The work is focused on the later stages of Radegund's life, when Radegund lived in a cell near Poitiers.

Scholars have noted the thematic differences between Venantius Fortunatus' and Baudonivia's biographies: whereas the former focuses on Radegund's deference to authority, the latter highlights her role as diplomat and protector of her community of nuns. The contrast between these two portrayals is the Fortunatus version focusing Radegund getting authority from others Baudonivia shows Radegund having her own authority derived from herself and shows a strong female role model. While Fortunatus relates the extensive self-mutilation Radegund performed, Baudonivia discusses her letter writing, her actions on behalf of the Church and individuals, her traveling to collect relics and, most importantly, her efforts to gain a fragment of the True Cross from Justin II, the Byzantine Emperor. The Baudonivia portrayal is in line with her goal as showing a role model for the nuns by showing how Radegund changed the world around her and her sacrifices were not just for herself but others as well. The book also includes all of the miracles performed by Radegund.

Baudonivia wrote her part of the Vita Radegundis as a part of the religious order following in the footsteps of Radegund and as a woman living in the historical moment of the Middle Ages. Fortunatus wrote his part as a man who knew Radegund on a personal level but Baudonivia wrote her piece as a woman who had Radegund as a role model. The inclusion of the Baudonivia part alongside that of Fortunatus stands as an example of what a woman can do, that her work was able to be placed beside the work of a man. Baudonivia followed in the footsteps of Radegund not just by being a nun in the abbey but by becoming a role model for nuns in her own right. The works of Fortunatus and Baudonivia were turned into an artistic manuscript that has looked at by hundreds of nuns after her time. In the eleventh century the abbesses of the Holy Cross convent were called to renegotiate their power and maintained their challenged authority by employing symbols of Radegund, based on the words of Baudonivia. Baudonivia herself inspired by Radegund inspired the artists creating stained-glass windows and manuscripts which protected the abbey.

She is memorialized in The Dinner Party by Judy Chicago.

References

Bibliography
 Baudonivia. "Life of Radegund." 
 Eckenstein, Lina. Woman under monasticism: chapters on saint-lore and convent life between A.D. 500 and A.D. 1500. University Press, 1896.
 McNamara, Jo Ann and John E. Halborg. Sainted Women of the Dark Ages. Durham: Duke University Press,1992.
 Mulhberger, Steve. “Overview of Late Antiquity--The Sixth Century,” ORB Online Encyclopedia. <http://faculty.nipissingu.ca/muhlberger/ORB/OVC4S6.HTM>
 Wemple, Suzanne Fonay. "Scholarship in Women’s Communities" in Women in Frankish Society: Marriage and the Cloister, 500 to 900 : University of Pennsylvania Press, 1981.
 
 
 
Edwards, Superior Women. Oxford: Oxford University Press. 2019

People from Poitiers
7th-century deaths
7th-century Frankish nuns
Hagiographers
6th-century women writers
6th-century Latin writers
7th-century women writers
7th-century Latin writers
Year of birth unknown
7th-century Frankish writers
